Gordon School is a coeducational, independent school located in East Providence, Rhode Island.

Gordon School may also refer to:

 General Gordon Elementary School, an elementary school in Vancouver, British Columbia
 Gordon Bell High School, a public junior and senior high school in Winnipeg, Manitoba, Canada
 Gordon Divinity School, a divinity school in Massachusetts
 Gordon Graydon Memorial Secondary School, a high school in Mississauga, Ontario, Canada
 Gordon Greenwood Elementary School, a public elementary school in Langley, British Columbia
The Gordon Schools, Huntly, Aberdeenshire, Scotland
Gordon High School can refer to:

Gordon High School (Georgia) in Decatur, Georgia
Gordon High School (Texas) in Gordon, Texas
Gordon High School (Nebraska) in Gordon, Nebraska
Gordon Junior High School (former name of Rose L. Hardy Middle School) in Washington, DC

 Gordon Parks High School, a public alternative learning center located in Saint Paul, Minnesota
 Gordon Sargent Primary School, a public elementary school in Nelson, British Columbia
 Gordon Tech High School, a Roman Catholic high school located in Chicago, Illinois

See also

 Gordon's School